Sergei Viktorovich Korchagin (born 28 July 1975 in Kuybyshev) is a former Russian football player.

External links
 

1975 births
Sportspeople from Samara, Russia
Living people
Russian footballers
PFC Krylia Sovetov Samara players
Russian Premier League players
Association football midfielders